Durbar Square, which means Royal Squares in English, is the generic name used to describe plazas and areas opposite the old royal palaces in Nepal. The name comes from Persian دربار (Darbar). It consists of temples, idols, open courts, water fountains and more. Before the Unification of Nepal, Nepal consisted of small kingdoms, and Durbar Squares are most prominent remnants of those old kingdoms in Nepal. In particular, three Durbar Squares in the Kathmandu Valley, belonging to the three  Newar kingdoms situated there before unification, are most famous: Kathmandu Durbar Square, Patan Durbar Square, and Bhaktapur Durbar Square. All three are UNESCO World Heritage Sites.These sites have received significant damage due to the devastating earthquake of 2015 but most structures still remain.

Further reading
von Schroeder, Ulrich. 2019. Nepalese Stone Sculptures. Volume One: Hindu; Volume Two: Buddhist. (Visual Dharma Publications). . Contains SD card with 15,000 digital photographs of Nepalese sculptures and other subjects as public domain.

See also
Durbar (court)
 Kathmandu Durbar Square
 Patan Durbar Square
 Bhaktapur Durbar Square
 

 
Squares in Kathmandu